Malatesta Malatesta may refer to:

Malatesta da Verucchio (1212–1312) or Malatesta (I) da Verucchio, founder of the Malatesta lordship of Rimini
Malatestino Malatesta (died 1317) or Malatestino (II) Malatesta, known as dell'Occhio, lord of Pesaro and Rimini
Malatesta II Malatesta (c. 1299 – 1364) or Malatesta II (or III) Malatesta, best known as Guastafamiglia
Malatesta IV Malatesta (1370–1429) or Malatesta (III or IV) Malatesta, known as dei Sonetti, son of Pandolfo II Malatesta